The 1961 Western Michigan Broncos baseball team represented Western Michigan College in the 1961 NCAA University Division baseball season. The Broncos played their home games at Hyames Field. The team was coached by Charlie Maher in his 23rd year at Western Michigan.

The Broncos won the District IV playoff to advanced to the College World Series, where they were defeated by the Syracuse Orangemen.

Roster

Schedule 

! style="" | Regular Season
|- valign="top" 

|- align="center" bgcolor="#ffcccc"
| 1 || April 1 || vs Duke || Seminole Field • Tallahassee, Florida || 3–10 || 0–1 || –
|- align="center" bgcolor="#ffcccc"
| 2 || April 2 || vs  || Seminole Field • Tallahassee, Florida || 6–7 || 0–2 || –
|- align="center" bgcolor="#ccffcc"
| 3 || April 4 || at  || Seminole Field • Tallahassee, Florida || 10–3 || 1–2 || –
|- align="center" bgcolor="#ffcccc"
| 4 || April 4 || at Florida State || Seminole Field • Tallahassee, Florida || 6–7 || 1–3 || –
|- align="center" bgcolor="#ccffcc"
| 5 || April 7 || at  || Unknown • Toledo, Ohio || 14–2 || 2–3 || 1–0
|- align="center" bgcolor="#ccffcc"
| 6 || April 8 || at Toledo || Unknown • Toledo, Ohio || 2–0 || 3–3 || 2–0
|- align="center" bgcolor="#ccffcc"
| 7 || April 14 ||  || Hyames Field • Kalamazoo, Michigan || 15–0 || 4–3 || 3–0
|- align="center" bgcolor="#ccffcc"
| 8 || April 15 || Miami (OH) || Hyames Field • Kalamazoo, Michigan || 11–8 || 5–3 || 4–0
|- align="center" bgcolor="#ccffcc"
| 9 || April 21 ||  || Hyames Field • Kalamazoo, Michigan || 4–1 || 6–3 || 5–0
|- align="center" bgcolor="#ccffcc"
| 10 || April 29 || at  || Cartier Field • Notre Dame, Indiana || 7–4 || 7–3 || 5–0
|-

|- align="center" bgcolor="#ccffcc"
| 11 || May 2 ||  || Hyames Field • Kalamazoo, Michigan || 10–6 || 8–3 || 5–0
|- align="center" bgcolor="#ffcccc"
| 12 || May 2 || Ohio State || Hyames Field • Kalamazoo, Michigan || 2–3 || 8–4 || 5–0
|- align="center" bgcolor="#ccffcc"
| 13 || May 5 ||  || Hyames Field • Kalamazoo, Michigan || 4–1 || 9–4 || 6–0
|- align="center" bgcolor="#ccffcc"
| 14 || May 6 || Ohio || Hyames Field • Kalamazoo, Michigan || 2–1 || 10–4 || 7–0
|- align="center" bgcolor="#ccffcc"
| 15 || May 12 || at  || Unknown • Huntington, West Virginia || 13–4 || 11–4 || 8–0
|- align="center" bgcolor="#ccffcc"
| 16 || May 13 || at Marshall || Unknown • Huntington, West Virginia || 12–3 || 12–4 || 9–0
|- align="center" bgcolor="#ffcccc"
| 17 || May 15 ||  || Hyames Field • Kalamazoo, Michigan || 8–10 || 12–5 || 9–0
|- align="center" bgcolor="#ffcccc"
| 18 || May 16 || Wisconsin || Hyames Field • Kalamazoo, Michigan || 1–3 || 12–6 || 9–0
|- align="center" bgcolor="#ccffcc"
| 19 || May 19 || at  || Unknown • Bowling Green, Ohio || 14–3 || 13–6 || 10–0
|- align="center" bgcolor="#ccffcc"
| 20 || May 20 || at Bowling Green || Unknown • Bowling Green, Ohio || 9–1 || 14–6 || 11–0
|- align="center" bgcolor="#ccffcc"
| 21 || May 23 ||  || Hyames Field • Kalamazoo, Michigan || 7–5 || 15–6 || 11–0
|-

|-
|-
! style="" | Postseason
|- valign="top"

|- align="center" bgcolor="#ccffcc"
| 22 || May 29 || vs  || Ray Fisher Stadium • Ann Arbor, Michigan || 3–1 || 16–6 || 11–0
|- align="center" bgcolor="#ccffcc"
| 23 || May 31 || vs  || Ray Fisher Stadium • Ann Arbor, Michigan || 8–1 || 17–6 || 11–0
|- align="center" bgcolor="#ccffcc"
| 24 || June 3 || at Michigan || Ray Fisher Stadium • Ann Arbor, Michigan || 4–3 || 18–6 || 11–0
|-

|- align="center" bgcolor="#ffcccc"
| 25 || June 10 || vs Boston College || Omaha Municipal Stadium • Omaha, Nebraska || 2–3 || 18–7 || 11–0
|- align="center" bgcolor="#ccffcc"
| 26 || June 11 || vs Texas || Omaha Municipal Stadium • Omaha, Nebraska || 8–2 || 19–7 || 11–0
|- align="center" bgcolor="#ffcccc"
| 27 || June 12 || vs Syracuse || Omaha Municipal Stadium • Omaha, Nebraska || 0–6 || 19–8 || 11–0
|-

Awards and honors 
Charles Dodge
 First Team All-MAC

Mike Gatza
 Second Team All-MAC

Bill Ihne
 First Team All-MAC

Ken Larsen
 Second Team All-MAC

Bill Ortlieb
 First Team All-MAC

Frank Quilici
 First Team All-MAC
 First Team All-American

References 

Western Michigan Broncos baseball seasons
Western Michigan Broncos baseball
College World Series seasons
Western Michigan
Mid-American Conference baseball champion seasons